JCCU may refer to:

 Japanese Consumers' Co-operative Union
 Jasper County Community Unit School District 1
 Jesuit Conference of Canada and the United States